Tolulope Akande-Sadipe (born on March 29, 1966) is a Nigerian politician from Oyo State, Nigeria. She represents Oluyole Federal Constituency in the House of Representatives and the only female Federal lawmaker from Oyo State. She is the chairman of the House Committee on Diaspora.

Early life, Education and Career 
Tolulope was born in Ibadan to the illustrious Akande Family of Ibadan. She graduated with a Bachelor of Science-Accounting degree from American University, Washington D.C., USA in 1987 and  obtained a Master's degree in International Business Management from Southeastern University, Washington D.C. USA in 1991.

She began her career as an accountant at a communication processing company called Enterprises for New Direction, which worked on transportation matters for the U.S. President. After that, she joined an accounting firm in Washington D.C. called Gardiner Kamya & Associates, where she gained experience in both audit and management consulting. Between 1988 and 1992, she was seconded to Peat Marwick (now KPMG)  to represent the firm in joint public sector audits of the District of Columbia Government and its agencies.

Political Career 
Under the Abiola Ajimobi administration, Tolulope was appointed Special Adviser to the Governor of Oyo State on Projects in 2016 and also appointed Special adviser to the Governor on Oyo State on Projects and Bureau of Investment Promotions in 2017. On 13th June, 2019, she was elected and inaugurated into the House of Representatives of Nigeria representing the Oluloye Federal Constituency of Ibadan, Oyo State on the All Progressives Congress (APC) platform.

References

21st-century Nigerian women politicians
21st-century Nigerian politicians
Members of the House of Representatives (Nigeria)
Women members of the House of Representatives (Nigeria)
Living people
1966 births
People from Oyo State
Yoruba women in politics